Prorophora grisealella is a species of snout moth. It is found in Senegal.

References

Phycitinae
Moths described in 1957